The Australian Ballet is the largest classical ballet company in Australia. It was founded by J. C. Williamson Theatres Ltd and the Australian Elizabethan Theatre Trust in 1962, with the English-born dancer, teacher, repetiteur and director Dame Peggy van Praagh as founding artistic director. Today, it is recognised as one of the world's major international ballet companies and performs upwards of 150 performances (both in Australia and overseas) a year.

History
The roots of the Australian Ballet can be found in the Borovansky Ballet, a company founded in 1940 by the Czech dancer Edouard Borovansky. Borovansky had been a dancer in the touring ballet company of the famous Russian ballerina Anna Pavlova and, after visiting Australia on tour with the Covent Garden Russian Ballet, he decided to remain in Australia, establishing a ballet school in Melbourne in 1939, out of which he developed a performance group which became the Borovansky Ballet. The company was supported and funded by J. C. Williamson Theatres Ltd from 1944. Following Borovansky's death in 1959, the British dancer and administrator Dame Peggy van Praagh DBE was invited to become artistic director of the company. J. C. Williamson Theatres Ltd decided to disband the Borovansky Ballet in 1961.

In 1961, J. C. Williamson Theatres Ltd and the Australian Elizabethan Theatre Trust received federal subsidy towards the establishment of a national ballet company. These organisations established the Australian Ballet Foundation to assist with the establishment of a new company, which in 1962 became the Australian Ballet. Peggy van Praagh, who had been kept on a retainer by J. C. Williamson Theatres Ltd through the intervening year between the disbanding of the Borovansky Ballet and the establishment of the Australian Ballet, was invited to become the founding artistic director of the company. The majority of the dancers employed by the fledgling company were drawn from former members of the Borovansky Ballet.

The first performance by the Australian Ballet was Tchaikovsky's Swan Lake, staged at Her Majesty's Theatre, Sydney on 2 November 1962. The principal dancers in the first season were Kathleen Gorham OBE, Marilyn Fay Jones AM OBE and Garth Welch AM. Van Praagh also invited the Royal Ballet's Ray Powell to temporarily become the company's first ballet master, with Leon Kellaway (brother of Cecil Kellaway), a former dancer with the Covent Garden Russian Ballet, as the company's first ballet teacher. In later years Sir Robert Helpmann CBE, Marilyn Jones AM OBE and Maina Gielgud AO made major contributions as Artistic Directors of the Australian Ballet.

In 1964 van Praagh established the Australian Ballet School, which was formed specially to train dancers for the company and remains the company's associate school to this day. Dame Margaret Scott AC DBE was the founding director of the school, followed by Gailene Stock CBE AM, Marilyn Rowe AM OBE, and now Lisa Pavane, all three former company principal artists.

Present
Today the company is based in Melbourne; its Southbank headquarters is the Primrose Potter Australian Ballet Centre, named after its long term supporter Lady (Primrose) Potter. The company tours to mainland state capital cities within Australia, with annual seasons in Melbourne at the State Theatre (accompanied by Orchestra Victoria) and in Sydney at the Sydney Opera House accompanied by the Opera Australia Orchestra. Other venues are the Lyric Theatre at the Queensland Performing Arts Centre in Brisbane, and the Adelaide Festival Centre in Adelaide. The company also tours internationally, and performs annually in an intimate outdoor setting on Hamilton Island.

The Australian Ballet works in close cooperation with the Australian Ballet School, of which many of the company's dancers are graduates. Giving approximately 200 performances a year, the Australian Ballet claims to be the busiest ballet company in the world. With a vast repertoire which includes the major classical and heritage works as well as contemporary productions, it follows its artistic vision of "Caring for Tradition, Daring to be Different". Each year, the company also presents an extensive national education and outreach programme including STEAMDANCE- a STEM-based dance curriculum, created and run by Head of Education Katy McKeown, a teacher education program and digital resources, to further inspire and educate its audiences. It's Dance Education team performs and teaches over 40,000 children per year with culturally relevant content.

Box office sales, derived from its strong and loyal audience base, are the foundation of the company's income stream. The Australian Ballet also receives funding from the Australian, Victorian and New South Wales governments, corporate sponsors, private donors and bequests.

The company's current artistic director is David Hallberg, who was a principal dancer with the American Ballet Theatre until 2020. The company's previous artistic directors were: David McAllister, AM (2001-2020); Ross Stretton (1996–2001); Maina Gielgud AO (1983–96); Marilyn Fay Jones AM OBE (1979–82); Anne Woolliams (1976–77); Sir Robert Helpmann CBE (1965–76) and the founding artistic director, Dame Peggy van Praagh DBE (1962–74; 1978)
The most recent appointment to the position of executive director is Lissa Twomey, former Executive Director of Bangarra Dance Theatre. Her predecessor was Libby Christie, who succeeded Valerie Wilder.

The Music Director and chief conductor of The Australian Ballet appointed this year is Jonathan Lo replacing, Nicolette Fraillon, the world's only woman chief conductor of a ballet company.

The Dancer Welfare and Development Coordinator is former North Melbourne Football Club defenceman Sam Wright, who took his position after his 2019 retirement.  Wright had previously been involved with rehabilitation using The Australian Ballet's Dr. Sue Mayes.

Company

Dancers with The Australian Ballet are:

Principal artists

 Dimity Azoury 
 Benedicte Bemet 
 Adam Bull 
 Joseph Caley 
 Brett Chynoweth 
 Chengwu Guo 
 Amy Harris 
 Robyn Hendricks 
 Ako Kondo 
 Callum Linnane 
 Amber Scott 
 Sharni Spencer

Senior artists

Soloists

Coryphées

Corps de ballet

Telstra Ballet Dancer Award

The Telstra Ballet Dancer Awards have been made annually since 2003, in support of the aspirations of The Australian Ballet's elite young dancers. It is the biggest prize available specifically to a dancer in Australia, with a cash prize of $20,000 to the winner. The Telstra People's Choice Award is made to the most popular of the nominees in that year, using internet and SMS voting. The winner of the People's Choice receives a cash prize of $5,000.

References

External links
 
 Behind Ballet, the Australian Ballet's blog
 The Australian Ballet education programme
 The Australian Ballet School
 , The Australian Ballet (1962–)
 The Australian Ballet Collection and Australian Archives of the Dance collections are held in the Australian Performing Arts Collection, Arts Centre Melbourne

 
APRA Award winners
 Australian Ballet, The
National Dance Award winners
Performing groups established in 1962
1962 establishments in Australia
Ballet in Australia
History of ballet
Sydney Opera House
Performing arts in Melbourne